The Mike Walsh Fellowships have been established by Mike Walsh, a former television presenter and theatre producer, for students/graduates in the arts and entertainment industry to enhance their experiences in Australia and overseas.

History 
The Fellowships began in 1996 and were limited to applicants from the National Institute of Dramatic Art (NIDA) as Sydney was where Walsh's business interests were. As his business interests grew further afield the applicants for Fellowships eligibility was widened to include of the Western Australian Academy of Performing Arts (WAPPA) and the Victorian College of the Arts (VCA).

It is Walsh's view that,... recipients of his fellowship may choose to travel abroad in order to obtain a wider knowledge and experience of theatre, perhaps through a formal course of study or by a self-devised program … to get out of your comfort zone is very important.His hope is that the Fellows will come back to share their knowledge and skills with others. The scholarship is offered annually to an unspecified number of people.

Erin James in Aussie Theatre wrote that,  Mike Walsh is one of the Australian Arts Industry’s most valuable members ... Walsh is committed to strengthening our industry in any way he can ... The Mike Walsh Fellowships to assist young theatre artists who have the potential to make a significant contribution to the Australian arts and entertainment industry.

VCA & WAAPA 
The Victorian College of the Arts is a faculty of the University of Melbourne which offers degrees in creative disciplines. This includes acting, dance, music theatre, production and writing. In 2011 the eligibility rules changes and students from VCA were able to apply for a fellowship. These changes also applies to students from the Western Australian Academy of Performing Arts whose graduates Walsh had seen and been impressed by, in many of the musical productions staged at his theatre, Her Majesty’s Theatre in Melbourne.

Recipients 
In the first 20 years of the award there have been over 90 recipients. Several have gone on to have Australian and International success. These include Jamie Jackson (1998), Joshua Lawson (2003), Brendan Moffitt (2007), Michael Agosta (2009), Trent Suidgeest and Alexandra Flood (2014)

Recipients are able to use the fellowship in any manner which increases their knowledge and experience. Claire Lovering (acting WAPPA)  a 2015 recipient from WAPPA received $8000 which she used for, " flights, course fees and accommodation for a five-week Chekhov Intensive Summer Course at the Stella Adler Studio of Acting in New York."

2004 recipient Nicholas Brown (costume)," travelled to India, Los Angeles, New York, London, Paris and Rome studying multiculturalism in theatre, film and television."

Nick Simpson-Deeks (acting) 2006 fellow undertook "a fulltime course of study at the Steppenwolf Theatre Company in Chicago; and Vincent Hooper."

2011 recipient Naomi Edwards (directing) used the fellowship combined with another fellowship "to visit arts organisations in England, Scotland, Japan and USA to research their education and engagement programs."

List of recipients 
The recipients of the Fellowships show the many disciplines which have been awarded Fellowships.

References

External links 
 

Australian theatre awards
Theatre in Australia
Awards established in 1996